"Me So Bad" is a song recorded by American singer Tinashe,   featuring fellow American singer Ty Dolla Sign and American rapper French Montana. It was written by the three said artists, Hitmaka, and A1 Bentley. It was released commercially for digital download via RCA Records on March 30, 2018, as the third and final single from Tinashe's third studio album, Joyride (2018), along with the album's pre-order.

Background
The song was first revealed in a picture Tinashe posted on social media on January 12, 2018. The singer teased the song again one week prior to its release. The song was released along with Joyrides pre-order.

Composition
"Me So Bad" is a "synth-heavy" R&B song with an island flavor. The song is three minutes and eleven seconds long. The song is in the key of B♭m, and moves at a tempo of 100 beats per minute in a 4/4 time signature. The song sees the singer confidently flaunting her body in the lyrics: "You want some me so bad, Come get this body."

Critical reception
Mike Nied of Idolator compared the song to Tinashe's previous singles "No Drama" and "Faded Love" and called it "the most energized of the group."

Music video
The music video for "Me So Bad" was released the same day as the single's release. The video is tennis-themed, and features Tinashe performing the song on a tennis court. The video also features stylized choreography and the singer in a plaid skirt and platinum braids, as well as a soft velour tracksuit. The music video for "Me So Bad" has become Tinashe's fastest to reach one million views on YouTube in 24 hours.

Credits and personnel 
Recording and management
Recorded at Glenwood Place Recording Studios (Burbank, California)
Mixed at Larrabee Sound Studios (North Hollywood, California)
Mastered at Chris Athens Masters (Austin, Texas)
Published by Shaybug Music/Sony/ATV Songs LLC (BMI), My Lord Prophet Music/APG/WB Music Corp. (ASCAP), Warner-Tamerlane Publishing Corp. (BMI), Phil Trackson/Primary Wave Beats/BMG Platinum Songs US (BMI), Radical Publishing Group LLC, BMG Rights Management LLC (BMI), The Songs Right Now Publishing/Warner-Tamerlane Publishing Corp. (BMI), Mayila Caiemi Marie Jones Publishing Designee (ASCAP), It's Drugs Publishing/EMI Blackwood Music, Inc. (BMI), Excuse My French Music II/Sony/ATV Allegro (ASCAP)
Ty Dolla $ign appears courtesy of Atlantic Recording Corporation.
French Montana appears courtesy of Bad Boy Entertainment/Epic Records, a division of Sony Music Entertainment.

Personnel
Tinashe – lead vocals, composition
Ty Dolla $ign – featured artist, composition
French Montana – featured artist, composition
Christian "Hitmaka" Ward – composition, production
Andre "Dre Moon" Proctor – composition, production
Floyd "A1" Bentley – composition, production
Montrell "Wavy" Martinez – composition, production
Simon "BLWYRMND" Schranz – composition, production
Mele Moore – composition
Christopher "Chrishan" Dotson – composition
Mayila Caiemi Marie Jones – composition
Miagi – recording
Jaycen Joshua – mixing
David Nakaji – mixing assistant
Ben Mitchev – mixing assistant
Chris Athens – mastering

Credits adapted from the liner notes of Joyride.

Charts

References

2018 singles
2018 songs
American contemporary R&B songs
French Montana songs
American pop songs
RCA Records singles
Songs written by French Montana
Songs written by Ty Dolla Sign
Tinashe songs
Ty Dolla Sign songs
Songs written by Tinashe
Songs written by Christopher Dotson
Songs written by Hitmaka
Songs written by Dre Moon
Song recordings produced by Yung Berg